WWNG (1330 AM) was a radio station broadcasting an adult standards/MOR format to the Havelock, North Carolina, United States area. The station was owned by Dick Broadcasting, through licensee Dick Broadcasting Company, Inc. of Tennessee. WWNG was limited to daytime operation only.

In September 2017, Dick Broadcasting announced the purchase of Alpha Media stations in three markets — 18 stations and two translators in total, at a purchase price of $19.5 million. The acquisition of WANG by Dick Broadcasting was consummated on December 20, 2017, at which point the station changed its call sign to WWNG. Dick Broadcasting surrendered WWNG's license on February 22, 2018, and it was cancelled by the Federal Communications Commission on February 23, 2018.

References

External links
FCC Station Search Details: DWWNG (Facility ID: 47108)
FCC History Cards for WWNG (covering 1959-1979 as WUSM / WKVO / WCPQ)

WNG
Radio stations established in 1962
1962 establishments in North Carolina
Radio stations disestablished in 2018
2018 disestablishments in North Carolina
Defunct radio stations in the United States
WNG
WNG